Bolognese may refer to:

 Someone or something from the city of Bologna
 Bolognese sauce
 Bolognese dog 
 Bolognese dialect, a dialect of Emiliano-Romagnolo, a Romance language
 Bolognese School (painting)
 Bolognese Swordsmanship
 Sant'Agata Bolognese
 Bolognese bell ringing art

People with the surname
 Franco Bolognese (14th century), Italian painter

See also
 Bologna (disambiguation)
 Bolognesi (disambiguation)